Lothian George Bonham-Carter J.P. (29 September 1858 – 1 January 1927) was an English cricketer.  Bonham-Carter was a right-handed batsman who bowled slow roundarm bowler, but with which arm is unknown, but he was one of the last cricketers to use this bowling style.  He was born in Adhurst St Mary, just north of Petersfield in Hampshire.

Early life and cricket career
The son of John Bonham-Carter, a Member of Parliament for Winchester, and Laura Maria Nicholson, granddaughter of abolitionist William Smith, Bonham-Carter was educated at Clifton College, where he represented the college cricket team. In 1876, he enlisted in the Royal Engineers (2nd Gloucestershire Engineer Volunteer Corps), holding the rank of Sub-Lieutenant. By 1878 he was serving in the Rifle Volunteer Corps (1st Berkshire) and held the rank of 2nd Lieutenant, in that same year he was promoted to lieutenant. By 1880, he had seemingly been demoted back to 2nd lieutenant and resigned his commission on 9 June 1880. Later in his life, he worked as a justice of the peace.

He later made his debut in first-class cricket for Hampshire against the Marylebone Cricket Club in 1880.  Four years would pass before Bonham-Carter would play first-class cricket for Hampshire again, with his next appearance coming in 1884 against Surrey. He made 6 further first-class appearances for Hampshire, the last of which came against Surrey in 1885. However, with Hampshire often uncompetitive, the county lost first-class status at the end of that season, and would not regain it until it was admitted into the 1895 County Championship, thus bringing to an end his first-class career.  In his total of 8 first-class matches, he scored 260 runs at an average of 17.33, with a high score of 67. This score, one of two fifties he made, came against Surrey in 1884. With the ball, he took 2 wickets at a bowling average of 31.50, with best figures of 2/22. Despite Hampshire's loss of first-class status, he continued to play for the county until 1888.

Later life

Bonham-Carter was a founder member of Petersfield Golf club in May 1891. Bonham-Carter was the first of the Bonham-Carters to begin their connection with the village of Buriton in Hampshire.  In 1910/11 he had Buriton House built, reputedly because his wife, Emily, did not like living in Buriton Manor, which was then a working farm. Bonham-Carter had two sons: Stuart Bonham Carter, who served in World Wars, reaching the rank of vice admiral in the Royal Navy, Algernon Bonham Carter, who was awarded the DSO in World War I, and a daughter, Esme, who became a Mrs Tomlinson and subsequently Mrs. Selwyn.  His brother-in-law was the fellow Hampshire cricketer Anthony Abdy.  He is also distantly related to the actress Helena Bonham Carter among others.

He died in Buriton on 1 January 1927. His estate passed to Algernon, with parts of it being sold in 1927 to the Forestry Commission to cover death duties.

See also
Bonham Carter family

References

External links
Lothian Bonham-Carter at ESPNcricinfo
Lothian Bonham-Carter at CricketArchive

1858 births
1927 deaths
People from Petersfield
People educated at Clifton College
Royal Engineers officers
Volunteer Force officers
English cricketers
Hampshire cricketers
Lothian
English justices of the peace
Military personnel from Hampshire
19th-century British Army personnel